Nobody Knows is a 1970 South Korean drama film directed by Jang Il-ho.

Plot 
Jeong-ah, who grew up at an orphanage, works as a maid, and is raped by Yeong, the son of her employer. Yeong was engaged to Hyeon-ju, but dislikes her and decides to marry Jeong-ah instead. He takes Jeong-ah to a church and celebrates their own wedding by themselves. Yeong's parents and relatives learn of the fact and go late to the church to celebrate with the new couple.

Cast 
 Oh Yu-kyeong ... Jeong-ah
 Noh Joo-hyun ... Yeong
 Choi In-suk ... Hyeon-ju
 Lee Nak-hoon
 Jung Hye-sun
 Choi Bool-am
 Lee Muk-won
 Choe Eun-jeong
 Gwon O-sang
 Yoon Il-ju

References

External links 
 
 Nobody Knows at the Korean Movie Database
 Nobody Knows at mydvdlist.com 

1970 films
1970s Korean-language films
South Korean drama films